Isabel Sandoval is a Filipina filmmaker and actress who lives in the United States. She directed the films Señorita (2011), Aparisyon (2012) and Lingua Franca (2019). She also directed a short film called Shangri-La (2021) as part of the Miu Miu's Women's Tales series of female-directed short films commissioned by the fashion brand.

Early life and education

Isabel Sandoval was born in 1982 in Cebu City in the Philippines.

She graduated summa cum laude from the University of San Carlos, then moved to New York City. There, she earned an MBA from New York University's Stern School of Business. She transitioned in 2014.

Career

In 2011, Sandoval directed Señorita, a film about a trans woman working on a political campaign and raising a young boy. She played the film's protagonist, though she was not out as trans at the time, and has said that the role helped her realize her identity. In 2012, she directed the film Aparisyon (Apparition), starring actresses Jodi Sta. Maria and Mylene Dizon, about a convent of nuns in a remote area of the Philippines in 1971, just before the declaration of martial law by Ferdinand Marcos. 

In 2019, she directed the film Lingua Franca, which she shot in 16 days in Brooklyn, New York, starring herself, Eamon Farren and Lynn Cohen. In the film, Sandoval plays an undocumented Filipina trans woman who falls in love with the adult grandson of the elderly woman for whom she is working as a caregiver. Sandoval became the first out trans woman of color to compete at the Venice Film Festival when Lingua Franca premiered there. The film won the award for best narrative feature at the Bentonville Film Festival, and was released by ARRAY and streamed on Netflix. Sandoval was named Best Actress at the 18th International Cinephile Society Awards, and at the Pacific Meridian International Film Festival.

In 2021, Sandoval wrote and directed Shangri-La (filmed in two months), a short film commissioned by the Miu Miu Women's Tales project which asks female directors to examine "femininity in the 21st century", releasing it in February 2021. Like Lingua Franca, Shangri-La deals with forbidden love and racial prejudice. The same year, she signed with Creative Artists Agency.

Sandoval is also developing a drama for FX, Vespertine, and a film, Tropical Gothic, about the haunting of a Spanish conquistador in the 16th century Philippines and based on the 1972 short story collection of the same name by Nick Joaquin. In March 2021, Tropical Gothic won the VFF talent highlight award at the Berlinale, worth 10,000 euros towards its production and according to her recorded interview with GMA News, has plans to be screened at either Cannes, Venice or Berlin.

She is also currently directing an episode of the FX drama series, Under The Banner Of Heaven, which stars Andrew Garfield.

Styles and themes

Influences 
Sandoval was inspired by films that depict impossible love relationships. She has stated that she enjoyed watching Hong Kong filmmaker Wong Kar-wai's film, In the Mood for Love (2000), for its style and profound melancholy. Its concept of emotional destination was a profound theme that influenced her. She sought to express illicit emotions that were distinctive, singular, and complex as she had not seen in films before. She was mentored by Ava DuVernay in developing the styles of work. Other films which she has cited as influencing her were: Ali: Fear Eats the Soul (1974) by director Rainer Werner Fassbinder. Then there was News from Home (1977) by Chantal Akerman, and Klute (1971) by Alan J. Pakula.

Filmography

Awards and nominations

See also
 List of transgender film and television directors

References

Further reading
 Tauer, Kristen. "Eye: Isabel Sandoval on Directing 'Shangri-La' For Miu Miu Women's Tale'." WWD, (2021):29-. Print
 Macnab, G. (2019). ‘Lingua franca’ director isabel sandoval lines up next project ‘Park lane’ (exclusive). Screen International,  
 How Trump's Presidency Helped Shape Isabel Sandoval's “Lingua Franca” Movie.(Broadcast Transcript). Washington, D.C: National Public Radio, Inc. (NPR), 2020. Print.
 Dalton, B. (2019). Luxbox boards isabel Sandoval's venice days premiere ‘Lingua franca’ (exclusive). Screen International, 
 Morgenstern, J. (August 27, 2020). 'Lingua franca' review: Looking for love; A filipina caregiver hopes to find a husband, and thereby a green card, in isabel sandoval's touching feature. Wall Street Journal 
 Sandoval, Isabel. (20xx). "Meet Isabel Sandoval", Passerbuys: real recommendations, real people. http://www.passerbuys.com/profiles/isabel-sandoval, Biography.

External links 
 
 Isabel Sandoval at Black Dog Films

Living people
1982 births
Filipino film actresses
Filipino film directors
Filipino women film directors
LGBT film directors
Transgender actresses
Filipino transgender people
Filipino expatriates in the United States